The Carmel-by-the-Sea World War I Memorial Arch is a World War I memorial designed in 1919 by architect Charles Sumner Greene and located at Ocean Avenue and San Carlos Street center median divider in Carmel-by-the-Sea, California. The Memorial Arch was designated as a significant monument in the city's Downtown Historic District Property Survey, The Memorial Arch was recorded with the Department of Parks and Recreation on November 16, 2001. The Memorial Arch has been a historic landmark since November 1921, when it was built for Carmel World War I veterans. The Spanish Mission Revival style arch is constructed of Carmel sandstone.

History

The World War I Memorial Arch was designed by Charles Sumner Greene (1868-1957) and constructed at the intersection of Ocean Avenue and San Carlos Street in Carmel-by-the-Sea, California. This location was once the horse watering trough and gathering place for horseback riders. The design generally resembles a bell tower of a California mission. Joseph McEldowney was a quarryman who helped source the stone for the memorial.

The cornerstone was laid on November 11, 1921, by Colonel John Jenkins of the 11th Cavalry Regiment from the Presidio of Monterey and retired Navy Commander John P. Pryor of the Monterey Peninsula American Legion at the first National Armistice Day celebration in Carmel. The city hosted a parade down Ocean Avenue, and the 11th Cavalry Band supplied the music. The arch was dedicated to “Those Who Served” in the First World War. Rev. Fred Sheldon of the Carmel Church and attorney J. H. Andresen spoke at the proceedings at the intersection of Ocean Avenue and San Carlos Street to a reviewing stand of local political and military dignitaries.

A plaque that Greene carved for the frame with the 61 names of people who served in the Army, Navy, and non-military service organizations such as the American Red Cross and YMCA, was originally displayed at city hall but never added. The arch is maintained by the nonprofit Friends of the Memorial Arch in cooperation with the Carmel's American Legion Post No. 512 and the City of Carmel-by-the-sea.

For forty-four years the arch did not contain a bell. Harry J. Downie (1903-1980) donated the first Spanish-style bell, believed to date back to 1692, which was added to the memorial in 1966 to mark the city's 50th anniversary. The bell is suspended from a timber beam almost certainly carved by Charles Greene. The arch was restored and rededicated on November 11, 1977.

There is a plaque that was installed in 1984, that reads: This Memorial is dedicated to the men of Carmel who responded to their country's call during World War I. We salute them.

The American Legion Post No. 512 raised the money for a new bell that was more in keeping with the one that Greene had originally designed for the World War I Memorial Arch. The bronze bell was installed in 2016 to honor the 100th anniversary of the incorporation of Carmel-by-the-Sea and dedicated on Veterans Day, November 11, 2016.  The old bell is stored at the Carmel library’s Henry Meade Williams Local History Room.

On October 6, 2017, the U.S. United States World War I Centennial Commission chose the arch as one of 100 memorials across the country to receive a matching $2,000 grant for restoration work in anticipation of the 100th anniversary of the end of World War I.

Every Memorial Day and Veterans Day, an American Legion Post 512 member rings the commemorative bell at 11:00 a.m., at Ocean and San Carlos followed by an open house at Post 512 on Delores.

The Memorial Arch is significant under California Register criteria in history as a community’s expression of respect for 56 Carmelites who served their county in World War I. It is also significant in the area of architecture as the work of architect, Charles Sumner Greene.

See also
 World War I memorials
 List of World War I monuments and memorials

External links

 Downtown Conservation District Historic Property Survey
 The 100 "World War 1 Centennial Memorials"
 Carmel-by-the-Sea World War I Memorial Arch

References

Military monuments and memorials in the United States
Buildings and structures in California
World War I memorials in the United States
Monuments and memorials in California
World War I memorials 
War monuments and memorials